Westside Radio 89.6FM is a community radio station based in Hanwell, Greater London broadcasting to the surrounding area of West London offering music and local information. The station was launched on 13 September 2007 after being awarded a community radio licence by Ofcom.

They broadcast from purpose built studios based at Clocktower Mews in Hanwell after moving from previous studios based in Southall.

The new website thisiswestside.com launched Monday 11 February 2013 at 5:00pm.

Notable past presenters  
Rickie Haywood Williams at Kiss (UK radio station) 
Pandora Christie at Kiss (UK radio station) (former 95.8 Capital FM) 
Alex Mansuroglu at Kiss
Andrea Zara at Kiss (UK radio station)
Annaliese Dayes at Heart (radio network)
Charlie Tisma at Kiss (Winner of The KISS Chosen One 2013) at Kiss (UK radio station)
Bobby Friction at BBC Radio 1, BBC Asian Network
Neev Spencer at Kiss
Jasmine Takhar at BBC Asian Network
Seema Jaswal at Premier League Worldwide, BDO World Darts Championship
Mark Strippel at BBC Asian Network (former BBC Radio 1Xtra)
Eve Jaso at Channel 4 FM
Raj and Pablo at BBC Asian Network  
Amy Solomon ITV (TV network) LBC
Georgia LA at Beats 1 (former SBTV, BBC Radio 1Xtra, Vevo)
Goubran Bahou at Goubtube, UniLad (former Wall Of Comedy) 
Claira Hermet former BBC Radio 1Xtra, GRM Daily, BT Sport
Murtz former BBC Asian Network
Panjabi Hit Squad at BBC Asian Network
Remel London at BBC Radio 1Xtra, Sky Television
Ameet Chana former at BBC Asian Network
 Graham 'The Captain' Kirk at (Redstone FM DAB Surrey/SW London)
 Reya El-Salahi at London Live (Former BBC Radio Nottingham) 
 Carla Battisti (UBC Entertainment Editor)
 Vallisa Chauhan at Sunrise Radio (former Buzz Asia)
 Amit Sodha at Sunrise Radio
 Sunny Hundal at BBC Television, Sky Television
 Lewis Davies former Fire Radio and Pontin's Bluecoat
 Adam Turner former DJ at Jemm 1
 Hannah Burns (former TV Presenter and current voice-over artist)

References

External links
This Is Westside.com
 Station Licence
Media UK Station Profile

Community radio stations in the United Kingdom
Radio stations established in 2007
Radio stations in London